The Star Awards for Best Theme Song is an award presented annually at the Star Awards, a ceremony that was established in 1994.

The category was introduced in 1997, at the 4th Star Awards ceremony; Sebastian Tan received the award for his theme song, 《和平的代价》 in The Price of Peace and it is given in honour of a theme song in a Mediacorp drama serial which has delivered an outstanding overall performance. The nominees are determined by a team of judges employed by Mediacorp. Prior to 2014, winners are selected by a majority vote from the entire judging panel. This rule was amended from 2014 onwards such that winners are selected by a majority vote from both the entire judging panel and the public via online voting.

Since its inception, the award has been given to 15 performers or performer groups. Jocie Guo was the most recent winners in this category for their theme song, 《温习》 in My Star Bride. Since the ceremony held in 2016, The Dream Makers is the only drama theme song to win in this category twice. In addition, Perfect Cut , The Unbeatables & Blessings are the dramas theme song that have been nominated on two occasions, more than any other drama theme songs. They also hold the record for the most nominations without a win.

Recipients

 Each year is linked to the article about the Star Awards held that year.

Multiple wins and nominations

The following Dramas Theme Songs received two or more Best Drama Theme Songs awards: 

The following Dramas Theme Songs received two or more Best Drama Theme Songs nominations:

References

External links 

Star Awards